Joshua Eagle and Sandon Stolle were the defending champions but lost in the final 3–6, 6–3, [13–11] against Mark Knowles and Daniel Nestor.

Seeds

  Mark Knowles /  Daniel Nestor (champions)
  Joshua Eagle /  Sandon Stolle (final)
  Petr Pála /  Pavel Vízner (first round)
  Michael Hill /  Jeff Tarango (first round)

Draw

External links
 2002 Dubai Tennis Championships Doubles Draw

2002 Dubai Tennis Championships and Duty Free Women's Open
Doubles